Events from the year 1975 in Canada.

Incumbents

Crown 
 Monarch – Elizabeth II

Federal government 
 Governor General – Jules Léger
 Prime Minister – Pierre Trudeau
 Chief Justice – Bora Laskin (Ontario)
 Parliament – 30th

Provincial governments

Lieutenant governors 
Lieutenant Governor of Alberta – Ralph Steinhauer  
Lieutenant Governor of British Columbia – Walter Stewart Owen 
Lieutenant Governor of Manitoba – William John McKeag 
Lieutenant Governor of New Brunswick – Hédard Robichaud
Lieutenant Governor of Newfoundland – Gordon Arnaud Winter 
Lieutenant Governor of Nova Scotia – Clarence Gosse  
Lieutenant Governor of Ontario – Pauline Mills McGibbon
Lieutenant Governor of Prince Edward Island – Gordon Lockhart Bennett 
Lieutenant Governor of Quebec – Hugues Lapointe 
Lieutenant Governor of Saskatchewan – Stephen Worobetz

Premiers 
Premier of Alberta – Peter Lougheed  
Premier of British Columbia – Dave Barrett (until December 22) then Bill Bennett 
Premier of Manitoba – Edward Schreyer  
Premier of New Brunswick – Richard Hatfield
Premier of Newfoundland – Frank Moores
Premier of Nova Scotia – Gerald Regan  
Premier of Ontario – Bill Davis 
Premier of Prince Edward Island – Alexander B. Campbell 
Premier of Quebec – Robert Bourassa 
Premier of Saskatchewan – Allan Blakeney

Territorial governments

Commissioners 
 Commissioner of Yukon – James Smith 
 Commissioner of Northwest Territories – Stuart Milton Hodgson

Events

January to June

 January 1 - Product labelling using the metric system is introduced
 February 18 - Sylvia Ostry is appointed Canada's first female Deputy Minister.
 March 4 - Television cameras are allowed to film in Parliament
 March 24 - The beaver becomes an official symbol of Canada
 March 26 - Alberta election: Peter Lougheed's PCs win a second consecutive majority
 April 1 - Environment Canada switches to degrees Celsius
 April 2 - The CN Tower is completed in Toronto
 May 28 - Centennial Secondary School shooting
 May 30 - The Yukon and the Northwest Territories are given seats in the Senate
 June 11 - Saskatchewan election: Allan Blakeney's NDP win a second consecutive majority
 June 18 - Prime Minister Pierre Trudeau announces the creation of the Foreign Investment Review Agency

July to December
 July 7 - David Lewis is replaced by Ed Broadbent as leader of the NDP
 July 23 - The Soviet Atlantic fishing fleet is banned from entering Canadian ports due to overfishing
 July 30 - Petro-Canada, the government-owned oil and gas company, is formed.
 September - Ontario schools begin to teach exclusively using the metric system
 September 1 - CKND, Winnipeg's newest television station, begins broadcasting
 September 11 - John Turner resigns from government to protest the implementation of wage and price controls.
 September 18 - Ontario election: Bill Davis's PCs win a minority
 October 2 – A blast at an explosives factory kills six in Beloeil, Quebec, Canada.
 October 4 - Mirabel Airport opens
 October 14 - Federal government introduces wage and price controls to limit inflation
 October 27 - St. Pius X High School shooting: Robert Poulin kills one person and wounds five at St. Pius X High School in Ottawa, before shooting himself.
 November 3 - CBC-FM rebranded as CBC Stereo
 November 10 - The SS Edmund Fitzgerald, based in Sault Ste. Marie sinks
 November 14 - Canada's first community-based campus radio station, CKCU-FM in Ottawa, hits the airwaves
 November 18 - The wearing of seatbelts is made mandatory in Ontario
 November 28 - Canadair nationalized
 December 22 - William R. Bennett sworn in as Premier of British Columbia, replacing David Barrett.

Full date unknown
 Izzy Asper acquires Winnipeg television station CKND, the beginning of what would become a national media empire.
 Rohinton Mistry emigrates to Canada
 First Canadian Place opens in Toronto
 Colin Thatcher, who would later become famous for his involvement in the murder of his ex-wife, is elected to the Saskatchewan Legislative Assembly.

Arts and literature

New books
 World of Wonders - Robertson Davies
 A Fine and Private Place - Morley Callaghan
 The Unwavering Eye: Selected Poems, 1969-1975 - Irving Layton
 It's Me Again - Donald Jack
 The Island Means Minago - Milton Acorn
 Jacob Two-Two Meets the Hooded Fang - Mordecai Richler
 Un jardin au bout du monde - Gabrielle Roy
 Jardin des délices - Roch Carrier

Awards
 See 1975 Governor General's Awards for a complete list of winners and finalists for those awards.
 Stephen Leacock Award: Morley Torgov, A Good Place to Come From
 Vicky Metcalf Award: Lyn Harrington

Music
 March 1 - Anne Murray and Oscar Peterson each win a Grammy Award.
 Paul Anka - Times of Your Life is released
 Joni Mitchell - The Hissing of Summer Lawns

Television
 Saturday Night Live, produced by Canadian Lorne Michaels and also featuring Paul Shaffer and Dan Aykroyd, premieres in the United States.

Sport 
March 16 - Alberta Golden Bears won their Third University Cup by defeating the Toronto Varsity Blues 2 games to 1. All the games were played at Northlands Coliseum in Edmonton
May 11 - Toronto Marlboros won their Seventh (and Final) Memorial Cup by defeating the New Westminster Bruins 7–3. The Final game was played at the Kitchener Memorial Auditorium Complex
May 12 - Houston Aeros won their Second (and Final) Avco Cup by defeating the Quebec Nordiques 4 games to 0. The deciding game was played at the Colisée de Québec
May 27 - Montreal, Quebec's Bernie Parent of the Philadelphia Flyers is awarded his Second Conn Smythe Trophy
November 21 - Ottawa Gee-Gees won their First Vanier Cup by defeating the Calgary Dinos by a score of 14–9 in the 11th Vanier Cup played at Exhibition Stadium in Toronto
November 23 - Edmonton Eskimos won their Fourth Grey Cup by defeating the Montreal Alouettes 9 to 8 in the 63rd Grey Cup played at McMahon Stadium in Calgary

Births

January to March
 January 1 - Tammy Homolka, murder victim (d. 1990)
 January 20 - Mark Allan Robinson, political activist
 January 22 - Shean Donovan, ice hockey player
 January 25 - Mia Kirshner, actress
 February 2 - Todd Bertuzzi, ice hockey player
 February 7 - Alexandre Daigle, ice hockey player
 February 15 - Serge Aubin, ice hockey player
 February 17 - Todd Harvey, ice hockey player and coach
 February 24 - Ashley MacIsaac, fiddler
 February 25 - Hercules Kyvelos, boxer
 March 17 - Andrew Martin, wrestler (d. 2009)

April to June
 April 4 - Kevin Weekes, ice hockey player
 April 7 - Owen Von Richter, swimmer
 April 22 - Greg Moore, racecar driver (d. 1999)
 May 13 - Jamie Allison, ice hockey player
 May 24 - Marc Gagnon, short track speed skater, triple Olympic gold medallist and multiple World Champion
 May 26 - Craig Hutchison, swimmer
 May 27 - Stella Umeh, artistic gymnast
 May 29 - Jason Allison, ice hockey player
 June 9 - Carolyne Lepage, judoka
 June 16 - Graham Ryding, squash player
 June 18 - Martin St. Louis, ice hockey player
 June 27 - Carlton Chambers, sprint athlete and Olympic gold medallist

July to September
 July 2 - Éric Dazé, ice hockey player
 July 5 - Patrick Hivon, actor
 July 17 - Troy Amos-Ross, boxer
 July 24 - Marnie Baizley, squash player
 August 13 - Marty Turco, ice hockey player
 August 14 - Dustin Hersee, swimmer
 August 15 - Brendan Morrison, ice hockey player
 September 9 - Michael Bublé, singer and actor

October to December
 October 2 - Michel Trudeau, student (d. 1998)
 October 23 - Holly McNarland, musician, singer and songwriter
 November 1 - Éric Perrin, ice hockey player
 November 7 - Mike Mintenko, swimmer
 November 12 - Kiara Bisaro, mountain biker
 November 15 - Yannick Tremblay, ice hockey player
 December 2 - Brett Lindros, ice hockey player
 December 9 - Damhnait Doyle, pop singer
 December 16 – Ben Kowalewicz, vocalist
 December 17 - Nick Farrell, boxer
 December 18 - Trish Stratus, pro wrestler
 December 20 - Andrew Hoskins, rower

Deaths

January to June
 January 25 - Charlotte Whitton, feminist, politician and mayor of Ottawa (b. 1896)
 March 18 - Alain Grandbois, poet (b. 1900)
 April 11 - Thomas Crerar, politician and Minister (b. 1876)
 May 28 - Michael Slobodian, murderer responsible for the Centennial Secondary School shooting (b. 1959)
 June 13 - Merrill Denison, playwright (b. 1893)

July to December
 August 27 - Jack Dennett, radio and television announcer (b. 1916)
 September - Pat Lowther, poet (b. 1935)
 October 27 - St. Pius X High School shooting
 Kim Rabot (b. 1958), victim
 Robert Poulin  (b. 1957), murderer
 December 4 - Graham Towers, first Governor of the Bank of Canada (b. 1897)
 December 12 - Roy Kellock, jurist and Justice of the Supreme Court of Canada (b. 1893)

See also
 1975 in Canadian television
 List of Canadian films of 1975

References

 
Years of the 20th century in Canada
Canada
1975 in North America